Tazeh Kand-e Tahmasb (also Romanized as Tāzeh Kand-e Ţahmāsb) is a village in Bozkosh Rural District, in the Central District of Ahar County, East Azerbaijan Province, Iran. At the 2006 census, its population was 206, in 49 families.

References 

Populated places in Ahar County